Mi madrecita ("My Dear Mother") is a 1940 Mexican film. It stars Sara García.

External links
 

1940 films
1940s Spanish-language films
Mexican black-and-white films
Mexican drama films
1940 drama films
1940s Mexican films